The 2006 Swale Borough Council election took place on 4 May 2006 to elect members of Swale Borough Council in Kent, England. One third of the council was up for election and the Conservative Party stayed in overall control of the council.

After the election, the composition of the council was:
Conservative 28
Labour 10
Liberal Democrats 8
Kent Campaign Against Increasing Council Tax 1

Election result
The Conservatives gained three seats after winning 11 of the 16 seats contested. They took two seats from the Liberal Democrats in Grove and Minster Cliffs wards, while also defeating a Labour councillor in Queenborough and Halfway by 17 votes. This took the Conservatives to 28 seats on the council, compared to 10 for Labour and 8 for the Liberal Democrats.

The Kent Campaign Against Increasing Council Tax failed to win any seats after standing in 9 of the 16 wards contested, coming closest in Sheppey Central where they finished second with 540 votes, compared to 636 for the Conservative councillor John Morris. This meant the former Conservative councillor Chris Boden remained the only councillor for the Kent Campaign Against Increasing Council Tax after the election.

Ward results

References

2006
2006 English local elections
2000s in Kent